Lingababu Love Story is a 1995 Indian Telugu-language comedy film directed by Vamsy. It stars Rajendra Prasad, Rajasri  and music also composed by Vamsy. The film was recorded as a flop at the box office.

Plot
The film begins at a colony where Lingababu a poltroon who runs a mobile canteen with his four friends maintains a good affinity with everyone due to his amicable nature. Once, he is acquainted with a charming girl Raaga, and falls for her. A few incidents pose Lingababu as a courageous guy before her and they couple up. Soon after the marriage, Lingababu learns that Raaga has a life threat from a dangerous goon Pakir Dada because of which she has married him to safeguard herself. Listening to it, Lingababu collapses. The rest of the story is a comic tale of how Lingababu protects his wife from the blackguard.

Cast

Rajendra Prasad as Lingababu
Rajasri as Raaga
Ali as Yama Guchi
Tanikella Bharani as Pakir Dada
Rallapalli as Velu Pille
Mallikarjuna Rao as Chakram
A.V.S as Pentapaadu Raja
Sudhakar as Pentapaadu Kumar Raja
M. S. Narayana as C.I. Bhajagovindam
Suthi Velu as Doctor
Sakshi Ranga Rao as Maamullu
Ironleg Sastry as Food Inspector Vaali
Dham as Begggar
Prabha as Lingababu's mother
Jayalalita as Aunty
Kovai Sarala as Bank Manager Ambhujam
Madhurima as Margaret
Swathi as Swathi
Kalpana Rai as Vaali's wife
Y. Vijaya as Jyothi Lakshmi

Soundtrack

Music composed by Vamsy. Music released on Supreme Music Company.

References

External links

Films directed by Vamsy
Indian comedy films
1990s Telugu-language films
1995 comedy films
1995 films